Coelus globosus is a species of beetle in family Tenebrionidae. It is found in Mexico and the United States.
The Globose Dune Beetle inhabits foredunes and sand hummocks immediately bordering the coast from Bodega Bay Head to Ensenada, Baja California, and all of the Channel Islands except San Clemente Island.

Sources

References

External links
Images: Adult, Larva

Tenebrionidae
Beetles of North America
Taxonomy articles created by Polbot
Beetles described in 1851